The Qʼanjobʼal (Kanjobal) are a Maya people in Guatemala. Their indigenous language is also called Qʼanjobʼal.

Notes

Indigenous peoples in Guatemala
Huehuetenango Department
Maya peoples of Guatemala
Mesoamerican cultures